Masafumi Hirai (平井 正史, born April 21, 1975 in Uwajima, Ehime Prefecture) is a Japanese former professional baseball pitcher.

External links

NPB.com

1975 births
Living people
People from Uwajima, Ehime
Baseball people from Ehime Prefecture
Japanese baseball players
Nippon Professional Baseball pitchers
Orix BlueWave players
Chunichi Dragons players
Orix Buffaloes players
Nippon Professional Baseball Rookie of the Year Award winners
Japanese baseball coaches
Nippon Professional Baseball coaches